The Blue Mountains Botanic Garden, originally known as the Mount Tomah Botanical Garden, is a  public botanic garden located approximately  west of the Sydney central business district at  in the Blue Mountains, in New South Wales, Australia. The garden is heritage-listed and is located on the boundary of the UNESCO World Heritage Site Greater Blue Mountains Area and can be accessed via the Bells Line of Road.

Description

The garden was established in 1972. It includes an additional  of land dedicated to conservation. The Trust is a division of the NSW Office of Environment and Heritage.

History 
The land was originally granted to Susannah Bowen, the mother of George M. C. Bowen, in 1830. She had arrived in the colony in 1828.

See also

 Australian Botanic Garden Mount Annan
 Auburn Botanical Gardens
 Macquarie Culvert
 National Herbarium of New South Wales
 Royal Botanic Garden, Sydney
 The Domain, Sydney

References

External links

 Blue Mountains Botanic Garden

Botanical gardens in New South Wales
1972 establishments in Australia
Tourist attractions in the Blue Mountains (New South Wales)